Nolan Baumgartner (born March 23, 1976) is a Canadian former professional ice hockey defenceman. He was formerly an assistant coach with the Vancouver Canucks of the National Hockey League (NHL). Baumgartner was selected by the Washington Capitals in the 1st round (10th overall) of the 1994 NHL Entry Draft. He played parts of ten seasons in the National Hockey League (NHL) for six different teams. Baumgartner played only one full season in the NHL, 2005–06 with the Vancouver Canucks, and spent most of his playing career in the AHL.

Playing career
Coming off a 1994 Memorial Cup championship with the Kamloops Blazers of the WHL, Baumgartner was chosen by the Washington Capitals in the first round, 10th overall of the 1994 NHL Entry Draft. Upon being drafted, he returned to the WHL and joined future NHLers Darcy Tucker, Shane Doan and Jarome Iginla to capture a second consecutive Memorial Cup in 1995. Baumgartner was named to the Memorial Cup All-Star Team for the second consecutive year. En route to the CHL championship, Baumgartner was distinguished with the airBC Trophy as the WHL playoffs MVP after scoring 17 points in 21 games and at the season's end, he was also awarded the Bill Hunter Trophy as the league's best defenceman.

Baumgartner's NHL career got off to an uneven start due to a serious shoulder injury. After playing the majority of his tenure in Washington with the Capitals' American Hockey League affiliate, the Portland Pirates, he was traded to the Chicago Blackhawks on July 20, 2000, for Rémi Royer. Baumgartner would continue to play in the AHL with Chicago's minor league affiliate, the Norfolk Admirals.

On July 11, 2002, he was signed as a free agent by the Vancouver Canucks. After one season with the Canucks, he was placed on waivers and picked up by the Pittsburgh Penguins on October 3, 2003. However, after just five games with the Penguins, he was placed on waivers again and reclaimed by Vancouver on November 1. Playing with the Canucks' AHL affiliate, Baumgartner captained the Manitoba Moose in the season of 2003–04 and scored, 27 points. As the Moose began play at the newly opened MTS Center in 2004–05, Baumgartner earned the distinction of scoring the first ever professional goal at the arena, on November 17, 2004. When NHL play resumed the following season, Baumgartner cracked the Canucks regular lineup and set NHL career highs in every statistical category, as well as leading all team defencemen with 34 points.

Following Baumgartner's breakout season, he became an unrestricted free agent, and on July 1, 2006, he signed a two-year deal with the Philadelphia Flyers. However, after six games, he was waived on October 17, 2006, and assigned to the Philadelphia Phantoms of the AHL a week later. Baumgartner was claimed on re-entry waivers by the Dallas Stars on February 24, 2007, and after spending the 2007–08 season with Dallas's AHL affiliate, the Iowa Stars, Baumgartner was reassigned by Dallas to the Manitoba Moose.

On July 2, 2008, he returned for a third stint with the Canucks, signing a one-year, two-way contract. He continued to play in the AHL for the Moose in 2008–09 and recorded 33 points in 72 games. He helped the Moose to the 2009 Calder Cup Finals, where they were defeated by the Hershey Bears. The following season, Baumgartner was named captain of the Canadian team for the 2010 AHL All-Star Game. He was called up by the Canucks on January 22, 2010, to replace injured defenceman Sami Salo.

On October 20, 2010, Baumgartner was named captain of the Manitoba Moose. This was Baumgartner's second stint as Moose captain, when he held this position during the 2005-06 AHL season.

Baumgarter retired from hockey at the end of the 2011–12 season with the Chicago Wolves and was named an assistant coach of the team.

International play
Baumgartner represented Team Canada twice in the World Junior Championships (1995, 1996), captaining the team in 1996 and capturing gold both years

Coaching career
On July 6, 2012 the Vancouver Canucks announced that Baumgartner would be an assistant coach with their AHL affiliate in Chicago. On June 14, 2013 The Vancouver Canucks relocated their AHL team to Utica, New York. Baumgartner was subsequently hired to be an assistant coach with the new Utica Comets. On June 7, 2017, Baumgartner was named as an assistant coach of the Vancouver Canucks.  Baumgartner was relieved of his duties by the Canucks on December 5, 2021 alongside head coach Travis Green

Awards

Major Junior
Memorial Cup championship (Kamloops Blazers) - 1994, 1995
Memorial Cup All-Star Team - 1994, 1995
airBC Trophy (WHL playoff MVP) - 1995
Bill Hunter Trophy (WHL's best defenceman) - 1995, 1996
CHL Defenceman of the Year - 1995 
WHL West First All-Star Team - 1995, 1996

AHL
AHL All-Star Game appearance - 2005, 2007*, 2010**

*starter, **captain of Canadian All-Stars

International
World Junior gold (Team Canada) - 1995, 1996
World Junior All-Star Team - 1996

Career statistics

Regular season and playoffs

International

References

External links

 

1976 births
Living people
Canadian ice hockey defencemen
Canadian people of German descent
Chicago Blackhawks players
Chicago Wolves players
Dallas Stars players
Ice hockey people from Calgary
Iowa Stars players
Kamloops Blazers players
Manitoba Moose players
National Hockey League first-round draft picks
Norfolk Admirals players
Philadelphia Flyers players
Philadelphia Phantoms players
Pittsburgh Penguins players
Portland Pirates players
Vancouver Canucks players
Washington Capitals draft picks
Washington Capitals players
Vancouver Canucks coaches
Canadian ice hockey coaches